The 2023 Russian regional elections will take place in Russia on Sunday, 10 September 2023, highly likely with possibility of voting on 8 and 9 September provided by the electoral authorities. There will be a by-election to the 8th State Duma, 25 gubernatorial elections (22 direct and 3 indirectly elected), 20 regional parliamentary elections, and many elections on the municipal and local level. These elections will also take place in the four occupied Ukrainian oblasts that were illegally annexed on 30 September 2022 amidst the military invasion of the country.

State Duma by-elections

Gubernatorial elections

Popular vote

Vote in parliament

Election procedure not yet determined

Legislative elections

Municipal elections

Mayoral

Municipal Councils

References 

2023 elections in Russia
Regional elections in Russia